The Chicago and Northwestern Railroad Depot was built by the Chicago and Northwestern Railroad (C&NW) in 1914 at a cost of $38,000. It is located at the west end of the business district in Redfield, South Dakota. The depot is a long rectangular red brick building with a slate roof in an uncommon Gothic Revival style.

The depot contains separate men's and women's waiting rooms, the agent's office which has ticket windows facing the entrance and an exterior bay window along the tracks, as well as a dining room, the kitchen, telegraph office and the freight office.

The Gothic Revival design of the depot emphasized the importance of the depot due to the rarity of Gothic Revival architecture for commercial buildings at the time. The first Chicago and Northwestern depot was built in 1891, ten years after the town had been named in honor of an auditor for the railroad. Redfield was an important subdivision point on the railroad and at times up to 250 residents of the town worked for the C&NW.

The depot was listed in the National Register of Historic Places because of the significance its architecture as an example of the work of Charles Frost of Frost and Granger of Chicago, the major architectural firm retained by the Chicago and Northwestern Railroad. It is also important as an example of the Gothic Revival architecture and its association with the development of Redfield.

Passenger service to the depot ended in the 1950s and renovations to the depot took place in the early 2000s. Today, the depot serves as a museum and visitor center.

References
Reis, Michael. Chicago and Northwestern Railroad Depot at Redfield National Register of Historic Places Registration Form, National Park Service, Washington, DC, 1980.

Charles Sumner Frost buildings
Railway stations on the National Register of Historic Places in South Dakota
Redfield, South Dakota
Railway stations in the United States opened in 1914
Transportation in Spink County, South Dakota
National Register of Historic Places in Spink County, South Dakota
Former railway stations in South Dakota